Adewale Amao (born 12 January 1990) is a Nigerian male professional squash player. He achieved his highest career ranking of 215 on April, 2015 during the 2015 PSA World Tour and is currently ranked 405th during the 2018 PSA World Tour.

References 

1990 births
Living people
Nigerian male squash players
People from Ilorin